This is a list of Iranian football transfers for the 2010 summer transfer window. Only moves featuring at least one Iran Pro League or Azadegan League club are listed.

The summer transfer window opened on 23 May 2010 and will close at midnight on 27 July 2010. Players without a club may join one at any time, either during or in between transfer windows. Clubs can also sign players on loan at any point during the season. If need be, clubs may sign a goalkeeper on an emergency loan, if all others are unavailable.

Iran Pro League

Esteghlal

In:

Out:

Foolad 

In:

Out:

Malavan 

In:

Out:

Mes Kerman

In:

Out:

Naft Tehran 

In:

Out:

PAS Hamedan

In:

Out:

Paykan 

In:

 

 

Out:

Persepolis 

In:

Out:

Rah Ahan 

In:

Out:

Saba Qom 

In:

Out:

Saipa 

In:

Out:

Sanat Naft 

In:

Out:

Sepahan 

In:

Out:

Shahin Bushehr 

In:

Out:

Shahrdari Tabriz 

In:

Out:

Steel Azin 

In:

Out:

Tractor Sazi 

In:

 

Out:

Zob Ahan 

In:

Out:

Azadegan League

Aboomoslem 

In:

Out:

Aluminium Hormozgan 

In:

Out:

Bargh Shiraz 

In:

Out:

Damash Gilan 

In:

Out:

Damash Lorestan 

In:

Out:

Esteghlal Ahvaz

In:

Out:

Etka Gorgan 

In:

Out:

Foolad Natanz 

In:

Out:

Foolad Yazd 

In:

 
 

Out:

Gol Gohar 

In:

Out:

Gostaresh Foolad 

In:

Out:

Hamyari

In:

Out:

Iran Javan 

In:

Out:

Machine Sazi Tabriz 

In:

Out:

Mes Rafsanjan 

In:

(

Out:

Mes Sarcheshmeh 

In:

Out:

Moghavemat Sepasi

In:

 

Out:

 

Out:

Sanati Kaveh 

In:

Out:

Shahrdari Bandar Abbas 

In:

Out:

Shahrdari Yasuj 

In:

Out:

Shamoushak Noshahr 

In:

Out:

Sepidrood Rasht

In:

Out:

Shirin Faraz 

In:

Out:

Tarbiat Yazd 

In:

Out:

References

transfers
Iran
2010